Huge in France is an American comedy series on Netflix starring Gad Elmaleh as a French comedian who has moved to Los Angeles in an effort to be closer to his son.

The show premiered on April 12, 2019.

Plot
Gad Elmaleh, or simply Gad, is a very popular comedian in France who has decided to move to Los Angeles to become closer to his estranged son, Luke. Luke is aspiring to become a model while his mother Vivian is an author and life coach. Vivian's boyfriend is Jason Alan Ross, a retired actor who is mentoring Luke on modeling.

Gad along with his assistant, Brian, devise various plans to disrupt the relationship between Jason and his old family.

Cast and characters

Main cast
 Gad Elmaleh as himself
 Matthew Del Negro as Jason Alan Ross
 Erinn Hayes as Vivian
 Scott Keiji Takeda as Brian Kurihara
 Jordan Ver Hoeve as Luke

Recurring 
 Austin Fryberger as Zene
 Keana Marie as James
 Brittany Ross as Heather
 André Tardieu as Adrian
 Chris D’Elia as himself
 Jerry Seinfeld as himself

Episodes

References

External links
 Huge in France at Netflix
 
 

2019 American television series debuts
2010s American comedy television series
French-language Netflix original programming
Television shows set in Paris
Television shows set in Los Angeles
English-language Netflix original programming